Andrea Brown (born May 21, 1982) is a pop, house and R&B singer from Brooklyn, US. She is also the cousin of singer Bobby Brown.

In 2001, she scored a #1 Hot Dance Music/Club Play track as the lead vocalist on Goldtrix's cover of Jill Scott's "It's Love (Trippin')".

References

See also
 List of Billboard number-one dance club songs
 List of artists who reached number one on the U.S. Dance Club Songs chart

20th-century African-American women singers
American dance musicians
American contemporary R&B singers
American house musicians
Musicians from Boston
Living people
1982 births
AM PM Records artists
21st-century American women singers
American women in electronic music
21st-century African-American women singers